The Detail is a Canadian television police procedural drama series, developed by Ley Lukins, that premiered on CTV on March 25, 2018. The series, which stars Angela Griffin in the lead role of Detective Stevie Hall, features a trio of female homicide detectives who solve crimes while dealing with their own personal lives. Although the series uses original scripts, the format is based upon British crime drama series Scott & Bailey. Following commission, a debut series of ten episodes was ordered by the network.

On June 5, 2018, just two days after the finale, it was announced that CTV had declined a recommission and the show would be cancelled after one season.  Outside of Canada, the series was purchased by Viacom for broadcast on 5USA in the United Kingdom, with broadcast commencing on November 2, 2018.

Cast
 Angela Griffin as Det. Stevie Hall
 Shenae Grimes-Beech as Det. Jacqueline "Jack" Cooper
 Wendy Crewson as Staff Inspector Fiona Currie
 David Cubitt as Det. Kyle Price
 Al Mukadam as Det. Aaron Finch
 Matt Gordon as Det. Donnie Sullivan
 Ben Bass as Marc Savage
 Claire Qute as Katie Hall
 Richie Lawrence as Nate Hall
 Dan Abramovici as Noah Griffin
 Elizabeth Whitmere as Rita Moretti

Episodes

References

External links

2018 Canadian television series debuts
2018 Canadian television series endings
2010s Canadian crime drama television series
2010s Canadian television miniseries
CTV Television Network original programming
Television shows set in Toronto
English-language television shows
Canadian police procedural television series
Television series by Entertainment One